Odd Fellows or Oddfellows is an international fraternity and its members.

Odd Fellows may also refer to:

Organisations

United Kingdom 
Order of Patriotic Oddfellows, formed in the mid-18th century in the south of England, favouring William III of England
Ancient Order of Oddfellows, formed in the mid-18th century in northern England, favouring the House of Stuart
Grand United Order of Oddfellows, founded in 1798 by neutral amalgamation of Order of Patriotic Oddfellows and Ancient Order of Oddfellows
Independent Order of Oddfellows Manchester Unity, founded in 1810 in a break from the Grand United Order of Oddfellows

International 
Independent Order of Odd Fellows, originally chartered in 1819 in Baltimore, United States, by the Manchester Unity of Odd Fellows, independent since 1842
Grand United Order of Odd Fellows in America, founded in 1843, principally including members of Afro-Americans and others of colour

Cemeteries 
 Odd Fellows Cemetery, in Burlington, NJ
 Odd Fellows Lawn Cemetery and Mausoleum, in Sacramento, CA
IOOF Cemetery, in Hamilton, Texas

Other uses
IOOF (company), originated as the Victoria Grand Lodge of the Independent Order of Odd Fellows, Australia
Memorial to Pioneer Odd Fellows, a California Historical Landmark located near Carson Pass in Alpine County, California, United States
Oddfellows (2013), an album by American rock group Tomahawk